Gardening by the Yard is an American gardening show that airs weekly on HGTV and is hosted by master-gardener Paul James.  It premiered in 1996.

HGTV states that Gardening by the Yard is for people who want their yards to look great but don't have time to spend on them.  James focuses on the lighter side of gardening and practices organic gardening.  Topics include composting, correct watering, plant zones, vegetable gardens, planting plants that are natural to your area, and many other gardening basics.

Most of the show is taped in James' Tulsa, OK backyard.  James is not afraid to show flaws in his yard as he claims this makes the show a real gardening program.  James will also have occasional guest gardeners give their own tips for specific fruit and vegetable crops such as growing fruit trees in containers or designs for the garden.  James often takes the show to locales across the country to visit other gardens or locally owned nurseries. The show has featured many guest stars over the years including James Gonzalez and Alexis Stewart.

2009 was expected to be the last year for the show as it has not been renewed. However, as of mid-2010, reruns are shown early weekday mornings.

As of January 2012, the show no longer appears on HGTV's schedule, but visitors to HGTV.com can find short web-cast reruns of the show.

As of April 2022, all 19 seasons of the program are available on Discovery+, a streaming subscription service owned by Warner Bros. Discovery.

References

External links
 HGTV/Gardening by the Yard

HGTV original programming